Venida Evans is an American television, film, stage and commercial actress. Evans is perhaps best known to audiences for her role as "The Muse" in a series of IKEA television commercials in the United States beginning in 2008.

Personal life
Evans was born in Ypsilanti, Michigan, but raised in Detroit. Her father (who was born on April 10, 1912) was 97 years old as of April 2009, while her mother is deceased.

Evans graduated from Southwestern High School in Detroit. She later attended Fisk University in Nashville, Tennessee. Evans also served as an enlisted member of the United States Air Force.

Career
Evans moved from her native Detroit to New York City in 1972 to pursue her acting career. She took a job as a theater usher on Broadway as a "survival job" to pay her bills while she simultaneously pursued acting jobs. Evans continued ushering until 1999, when she began acting full-time. In a 2009 interview with The Detroit News, Evans stated that she would still return to her past job if her acting career ever stalled saying, "I still know how to say 'Five rows up and six seats over."

Evans' earlier film credits included a small role as a nurse in the 1981 film, Only When I Laugh. She has also appeared in the 1998 Merchant Ivory Productions film, Side Streets and in several episodes of the NBC series Law & Order and Law & Order: Special Victims Unit. Other television credits have included Third Watch and New York Undercover.

Recent career
Venida Evans began appearing in a series of IKEA advertisements beginning in 2008 as an invisible, older woman known simply as "The Muse." The commercials were created by Deutsch New York, the ad agency which is responsible for IKEA's advertisements in the United States. While some television viewers thought that Evans was a ghost in the IKEA ad campaign, executives at Deutsch New York envisioned her character as a "muse." Peter Nicholson, the chief creative officer of Deutsch New York, described the concept of the muse which Evans plays in the commercials saying, "She's the voice of reason and support and your consciousness of why you made a good purchase of an Ikea product. She's got this Mary Poppins quality to me."

Critics and viewers have taken notice of both Evans and the IKEA ad campaign. The ads have variously been described as "surreal" and "creepy." Philadelphia Daily News columnist Ellen Gray compared Evans' IKEA "Muse" to Bruce Willis' character in The Sixth Sense. Evans has said that she never intended for her character in the commercials to be creepy.

Evans' other recent work has included a recurring role on the CBS soap opera, Guiding Light, where she plays a grandmother named Loretta. She has also stated that she will audition for a part in a future Adam Sandler film, noting that her career has accelerated since the launch of the IKEA commercials in 2008.

Evans referred to herself as a "flavor of the month" in a 2009 interview with The Detroit News. She was referring specifically to the sudden interest in her career after working as an actress for more than thirty years. Evans told The Detroit News, "Baby, it's a roller coaster ride. But I'm having a lot of fun...There have been a lot of ups and downs. But suddenly I'm experiencing a real up-kick, which is scary but exciting." On May 21, 2009, she also appeared on ABC's Who Wants To Be A Millionaire winning $8000.

Filmography

References

External links

 

African-American actresses
Actresses from Detroit
Actresses from New York City
American soap opera actresses
American television actresses
Fisk University alumni
Living people
People from Ypsilanti, Michigan
United States Air Force airmen
Female United States Air Force personnel
African-American female military personnel
Year of birth missing (living people)
21st-century African-American people
21st-century African-American women
African-American United States Air Force personnel